Count Ferdinand Troyer (February 1, 1780 – July 23, 1851) was an Austrian noble, philanthropist, and amateur clarinettist.

Born in Brünn (Brno), Moravia, Troyer became the chief steward to Archduke Rudolf of Austria-Tuscany. It was noted that on 2 March 1817, Troyer played the obbligato to Wolfgang Amadeus Mozart's Parto for the Vienna Philharmonic Society at the Large Ridotto Room. His sound was described as being "sensitive," with an "extremely tender handling" of the clarinet.

Because of the popularity of Ludwig van Beethoven's E-flat Septet, in early 1824, Troyer commissioned Franz Schubert to write a companion piece. Schubert accepted the commission but enriched the seven-part instrumentation of Beethoven's septet with an additional violin to create an octet. The octet was completed on 1 March 1824 and was first performed at Troyer's townhouse in Vienna, where Troyer himself played the clarinet part. He died in Vienna.

References 
 Weston, P, More clarinet virtuosi of the past, p259

1780 births
1851 deaths
Musicians from Brno
People from the Margraviate of Moravia
Austrian people of Moravian-German descent
Counts of Austria
Austrian classical clarinetists
19th-century classical musicians